Someone to Watch Over Me is a 2016 Philippine television drama romance series broadcast by GMA Network. It premiered on the network's Telebabad line up and worldwide on GMA Pinoy TV from September 5, 2016, to January 6, 2017, replacing Juan Happy Love Story.

Urban Luzon and NUTAM (Nationwide Urban Television Audience Measurement) ratings are provided by AGB Nielsen Philippines.

Series overview

Episodes

September 2016

October 2016

November 2016

December 2016

January 2017

References

Lists of Philippine drama television series episodes